Jan Brueghel can refer to two Flemish painters:

Jan Brueghel the Elder (1568–1625)
Jan Brueghel the Younger (1601–1678)